Bremen Senior High School is a public high school located in Bremen, Indiana. It opened in 1901.

History 
Bremen has had four different school buildings. The first one was a wood frame building on the north side of town at the corner of Montgomery and Bike. It then got replaced with a brick building on the same lot. In 1939, a new high school was built at a cost of $250,000. In 1962 the present high school was built. Sixteen years later in 1978, the high school was expanded to include a media center, auditorium, choir and band center, swimming pool, and additional gymnasium.

Athletics 
Bremen has a football team dating back to the early 1900's but it was discontinued in 1907 due to risk of serious injuries. The School added football again in 1954.

The Bremen football team won the State Championship in 1989(A) and 1994(AA). The softball team won state in 2019(AA).

Notable alumni 
Jack Jordan - Indiana House of Representatives for the 17th district

See also
 List of high schools in Indiana

References

External links
 Official Website

Buildings and structures in Marshall County, Indiana